Ronnie Dixon (born May 10, 1971) is a former professional American football defensive lineman who played four seasons in the National Football League (NFL) for the New Orleans Saints,  Philadelphia Eagles, New York Jets, and Kansas City Chiefs. He currently lives in Cincinnati, Ohio, where he works as a readymix concrete truck driver.

Career
Ha was traded on April 18, 1997, by the Eagles to the Jets for the 1997 7th round pick later used to draft Koy Detmer.

References

1971 births
American football defensive linemen
New Orleans Saints players
Philadelphia Eagles players
New York Jets players
Kansas City Chiefs players
Cincinnati Bearcats football players
Living people
People from Clinton, North Carolina